Little Big are a Russian rave band founded in Saint Petersburg in 2013. The band currently consists of Ilya "Ilich" Prusikin and Sonya Tayurskaya. Their first full-length album, With Russia from Love, was released on 17 March 2014. The group has released a total of four albums and nine singles. The band is currently based out of Los Angeles, California, following the 2022 Russian invasion of Ukraine.

History 
The band was formed by musician Ilya Prusikin and videomaker Alina Pasok and made their debut on 1 April 2013, releasing their first video "Every Day I'm Drinking". They made their first public appearance on 2 July 2013 at the club A2, opening for Die Antwoord. They have toured in Europe, Russia, and North America. "This music is really in demand. We have not invested a single penny, just shot video, and became known in Europe", Ilya Prusikin said in an interview with UTV. On 19 December 2015, the band released their second album, Funeral Rave. It was 8th on the Russian iTunes chart for the 52nd week of 2015. On 21 May 2016, videos for the songs "Give Me Your Money" and "Big Dick" received a prize at the Berlin Music Video Awards 2016. "Big Dick" won Most Trashy, and "Give Me Your Money" won third place for Best Performer. "Big Dick", with over 70 million views, is full of sexual imagery and overtones. "We just want to show people that they own their lives. Countries and governments are not as important as they think, a person can deal with what he wants", said frontman Ilya Prusikin on the purpose of the band in an interview with Noisey.

In April 2018, Olympia Ivleva decided to leave the band. Later that year, she stated her "burnout after five years of doing the same job", combined with intention to start her own non-musical businesses (chocolate paste and lingerie), were the reasons behind her exit. Little Big achieved viral success with the release of the video for "Skibidi" on 5 October 2018. The video features a dance that became popular when others tried to imitate it as part of the "Skibidi Challenge". Little Big took the first prize in the Most Trashy category at the Berlin Music Video Awards 2018 for their music video ''Lolly Bomb'', and their music video ''Skibidi'' won the first place in the Best Concept category in the festival's 2019 edition.

In March 2020, Little Big were announced as Russia's entry for the Eurovision Song Contest 2020, where they would have performed "Uno". The music video for the song, released at the same time, features Yuri Muzychenko from The Hatters and Florida Chanturia from Leningrad, both of whom were to join the band on stage during the contest. However, on 18 March 2020, the event was cancelled due to the COVID-19 pandemic. In 2020, the band won the Most Trashy category with their video ''Go Bananas'' at the Berlin Music Video Awards. The same year, they also placed third for the Best Music Video. In October 2020, Little Big's cover version of "Gonna Make You Sweat (Everybody Dance Now)" was used over both the trailer and the closing credits of Borat Subsequent Moviefilm.On 30 December 2020, the group performed the song "Mamma Maria" on the Evening Urgant New Year's special, Ciao, 2020!, under the name Piccolo Grandi.

On 1 March 2021, Little Big announced on Instagram that founding member Anna Kast had died. On 8 March 2021, Little Big released a new single, "Sex Machine," along with a video which referenced the video to "Uno" the year prior. However, they subsequently posted on Instagram, "We are not going to Eurovision 2021. We think that Russia has many talented and unique artists, each one of them deserves the chance to be seen out there." Little Big was nominated for Best Art Director with their music video ''S*ck My D*ck 2020'' at the Berlin Music Video Awards 2021. On 24 November 2021, Little Big released the video "“LITTLE BIG NFT SURPRISEN EGG” episode 1" (sic) to announce that the band was making NFTs. On 1 December 2021, people could buy 1 of 1000 unique surprise eggs which would hatch a week later, revealing one of the designs. Ilya Prusikin stated that they were inspired by Kinder Surprise Eggs, which are popular in Russia. On 11 February 2022, the single 'Ebobo' by Glukoza was 'Inspired and Evilized by Little Big'. Members of the group can be seen in the music video and on the cover art for the single.

Following the 2022 Russian invasion of Ukraine, the two leaders of the band, Prusikin and Tayurskaya, relocated to Los Angeles, California on the 2nd of March. They stated that they were on a government blacklist, and aren't allowed to perform any shows in Russia. When asked about a possible return to Russia, they stated that it will be possible "when Putin leaves". On 24 June, the band released the single "Generation Cancellation", which carries a pacifist, anti-war message, characterizing it as a war of war profiteering old men, a chess game with soldiers as chess pieces to be sacrificed at will, with gloomy consequences on younger generations. However, it was regarded by many Ukrainians as rather anti-American and anti-West rather than anti-Russian or even anti-war. This caused their show in Kraków, that was supposed to take place 12th of November, to be cancelled.  The band plans to release a fifth studio album in the year. Prusikin noted that "We are a band that likes to work in so many styles: pop, rave, punk and hardcore. And (now) we embody our ambition and love for different genres in the (new) album. It will be different".

Musical style 

The team calls itself a satirical art collaboration, which relies on the music, visuals, and the show. Little Big mocks various national stereotypes about Russia. All the videos are filmed by co-founder Alina Pasok. The band shoots and produces all of their music videos.

Since the first concert took place as the opening act for Die Antwoord, the band was dubbed "The Russian Die Antwoord", and is often compared with this band. Vice also called Little Big "a Russian mental patient's answer to Die Antwoord". Other critics point out that while Little Big has an identity of its own, it also exposes the listener to Russian folk songs and Russian culture.

The band was influenced by a variety of musicians from Cannibal Corpse, NOFX, Red Hot Chili Peppers, Rammstein, and The Prodigy to Mozart and Vivaldi.

Discography

Studio albums

Live albums

Compilation albums

Extended plays

Singles

Participation 
 2014 - Noize MC - «Капитан Америка (Не берёт трубу)»
 2016 - The Hatters - «Russian Style»
2017 - Electric Callboy - "Nightlife"
 2018 - The Hatters - «Forever Young Forever Drunk» (feat. Just Femi)
 2019 - Animal ДжаZ - «Чувства»
 2019 - Злой Малой - «В долгий путь» (1 раунд 17ib)
 2020 - Finch Asozial - «Rave Religion»
2021 - The Hatters - «Everyday I'm Drinking (feat. Little Big) - Live 2021

Awards and nominations

References

External links

 
 Little Big profile on Warner Music Russia
 
 

Musical groups established in 2013
2013 establishments in Russia
Russian electronic music groups
Eurovision Song Contest entrants of 2020
Eurovision Song Contest entrants for Russia
Musical groups from Saint Petersburg
Russian hip hop groups
Russian activists against the 2022 Russian invasion of Ukraine